James Robbins may refer to:

 James Robbins (journalist) (born 1954), BBC journalist
 James Robbins (shipbuilder) (died 1680), Danish shipbuilder
  James O. Robbins (executive) (died 2007), Cable television executive
 James S. Robbins (born 1962), American author, professor, and special assistant to the US Undersecretary of Defense 
  James W. Robbins (1801–1879), American physician and botanist
 J. Robbins (born 1967), American rock musician
 Jimmy Robbins (born 1989), American singer-songwriter and producer

See also
 James Robins, epidemiologist and biostatistician